Dutch(-)Korean or Korean(-)Dutch  may be:
Eurasian (mixed ancestry) people of Dutch and Korean descent in any country
Persons with multiple citizenship of the Netherlands and North or South Korea
Dutch people in Korea
Koreans in the Netherlands
Netherlands–North Korea relations
Netherlands–South Korea relations